Kangerong Station is a pastoral lease that operates as a cattle station in Queensland.

Kangerong has double frontage to the Basalt River. Bordered by both Maryvale Station and Niall Station, all the properties are in the fertile basalt country and are flanked by the Clarke River, a tributary of the Burdekin River.

The property is divided into 30 paddocks with seven holding paddocks with a carrying capacity estimated at 9,000 cattle. The property has a homestead, guest accommodation, a dry-weather airstrip, staff quarters and steel stockyards.

It sold for 16 million in 2008; the owner of the  property went into receivership in 2013.

It was passed in at auction in 2012 for 12.75 million.

In 2014 the drought-struck station stocked with 3,500 cattle was sold at a discounted 10 million to the Agricultural Investment Development Corporation on behalf of an overseas client.

See also
List of ranches and stations

References

Stations (Australian agriculture)
Pastoral leases in Queensland